Blood Memory may refer to:

 the autobiography of dancer Martha Graham, published in 1991
 Blood Memory (novel), a novel by Greg Iles, published in 2005
 "Blood Memory" (Supergirl), an episode of Supergirl
 a series of photographs taken by the Yugoslavian-born photographer Lala Meredith-Vula in Kosova during 1991 and 1992
 an alternative term for a genetic memory

See also 
 Blood and Memory, a fantasy novel by Fiona McIntosh, published in 2004.